Roberts' horseshoe bat (Rhinolophus rhodesiae) is a species of bat in the family Rhinolophidae. It lives in Mozambique and other parts of Southern Africa. 

Although some sequences of the mtDNA and nuclear DNA are identical to those in the Bushveld horseshoe bat (a common phenomenon in bats due to historical introgression), this particular bat was recognized as a separate species based on morphologicalphenotypic traits and acoustics. Its specific name, rhodesiae, means 'from Rhodesia' in Latin. As it was discovered fairly recently, conservation status has not yet been evaluated.

References

Rhinolophidae
Mammals of Mozambique
Mammals described in 1946
Bats of Africa